The Dutch Tweede Divisie in the 1956–57 season was contested by 30 teams, divided in two groups. It was the first season of the new lowest tier of Dutch professional football, organised by the Royal Dutch Football Association (KNVB). Teams could not be relegated to amateur football. RBC and Leeuwarden won the championship and were promoted to the Eerste Divisie.

The composition of the league was based on the results of the previous season. The teams that had finished lowest in the Dutch amateur Eerste Klasse would play in this new league. Teams that finished higher, would start in the Eerste Divisie.

The league had been divided in two, with a Tweede Divisie A and a Tweede Divisie B, each comprising 15 teams. Teams from the Tweede Divisie A were roughly from the north and east of the Netherlands, teams from the Tweede Divisie B roughly from the west and south.

Tweede Divisie A

Tweede Divisie B

See also
 1956–57 Eredivisie
 1956–57 Eerste Divisie

References
Netherlands - List of final tables (RSSSF)

Tweede Divisie seasons
3
Neth